The Audreys are an Australian blues and roots band which formed in Adelaide, in 2004 by founding mainstay, Taasha Coates on lead vocals, melodica, harmonica and ukulele. They have released four studio albums, Between Last Night and Us (February 2006), When the Flood Comes (April 2008), Sometimes the Stars (October 2010) and 'Til My Tears Roll Away (March 2014). Founding guitarist, Tristan Goodall, died on 2 July 2022, aged 48, of an unspecified illness.

Biography

2004–2005: Foundation and early years 

A precursor to the Audreys started in Melbourne as a duo consisting of lead singer Taasha Coates and guitarist Tristan Goodall. Goodall had been a member of a band, the Milk, in Adelaide, from the early to mid-1990s. The pair had met in 1997 as university students in Adelaide. After finishing tertiary studies they moved to Melbourne where the duo played original pop songs and slowed-down cover versions of 1980s songs. An impromptu jam session with a bluegrass band at a winery in the Macedon Ranges, in mid-2003 inspired them to change direction from pop to folk and blues. 

The duo moved back to Adelaide, where they formed the Audreys in 2004 and first performed in June of that year. The original line-up had Coates on lead vocals, melodica, harmonica and ukulele, Cameron Goodall on guitar, bass guitar and backing vocals, his brother Tristan Goodall on guitar and banjo and Michael Green (a.k.a. Mikey G) on violin, lap steel guitar and backing vocals. The group self-released a five-track extended play, You & Steve McQueen in 2005. It provided the singles, "Oh Honey" and "You & Steve McQueen". Australian musicologist, Ian McFarlane, described their sound, "a tuneful blend of alt-country and folk rock that had parallels with other roots rock acts" specifying fellow Australians, the Waifs, Claire Bowditch, Angus & Julia Stone and Mama Kin.

2006–2009: Between Last Night and Us & When the Flood Comes

The band's debut album Between Last Night and Us was released in February 2006, and featured the singles "Banjo & Violin", "Oh Honey" and "You and Steve McQueen". At the ARIA Music Awards of 2006, Between Last Night And Us won the ARIA Award for Best Blues and Roots Album, and its songs were used as the soundtrack for the 2007 ABC TV series, Rain Shadow. 

Their second album, When the Flood Comes, was released in April 2008, and at the ARIA Music Awards of 2008 it won the ARIA Award for Best Blues and Roots Album. The album featured the single "Paradise City". Tracks "Small Things" and "Lay Me Down" have been included on movie and television program soundtracks both in Australia and the USA. "Small Things" was used as soundtrack music in the November 2010 episode of Neighbours, when Steph Scully was sentenced to 6 years in jail for the death of Ringo Brown. "Small Things" was also featured in an episode of the US series One Tree Hill (TV series). 

The band have appeared at Australian festivals such as Bluesfest, WOMADelaide, Groovin' the Moo, Tamworth, Queenscliff Music Festival, Bass in the Grass, A Day on the Green, Woodford Folk Festival, Red Hill Harvest Festival, Port Fairy Folk Festival, The Great Escape, The East Coast Blues & Roots Music Festival, Southbound, Mossvale Music Festival, Great Southern Blues & Rockabilly Festival, The Falls Festival and the Adelaide leg of the Big Day Out in 2007. They have also toured overseas, including shows in the United States, Canada, the United Kingdom, France and Russia.

2010–2015: Sometimes the Stars & Til My Tears Roll Away

Following the departure of Cameron Goodall and Michael Green, Taasha Coates and Tristan Goodall continued as a duo and recorded their third album. The album included work from Tim Rogers, jazz pianist Paul Grabowsky, members of Tripod, and Michael Barker of the John Butler Trio. The duo once again worked under the guidance of producer, engineer and friend Shane O'Mara. 

In October 2010 The Audreys released their third album, titled Sometimes the Stars, which debuted at #28 on the ARIA charts. Following the release of the album, The Audreys toured throughout Australia in October, November and December 2010. At the ARIA Music Awards of 2011, the group won their third ARIA award for Best Blues and Roots Album.

In March 2012, a 3CD box set called Collected was released, featuring the first three studio albums. The digital version included seven bonus tracks, including the song "Train Wreck Blues", which was released as a single.

In March 2014, the group released their fourth album 'Til My Tears Roll Away, which peaked at number 32 on the ARIA Charts. The album was preceded by the lead single "My Darlin' Girl" in January 2014. At the ARIA Music Awards of 2014, the band were again nominated for Best Blues and Roots Album.

2016–present: solo work
In 2016, Taasha Coates released her first solo record Taasha Coates and her Melancholy Sweethearts through ABC Music and produced by fellow Australian, producer Shane Nicholson. The first single and video for the album was "This House Is Gonna Burn", a song about domestic violence. Overall the record has a harder edge than most of the material Taasha penned in her band The Audreys, though the artistic and thematic through lines are quite clear. Songs from the album are featured prominently in the ABC miniseries Pulse.

Taasha lives in the Adelaide Hills with her two children. Tristan resided in Brisbane, and The Audreys still play often around Australia.

On 16 September 2021, the band announced via their Facebook page that Tristan Goodall had "retired permanently from playing and touring" but that Coates had "created a new line-up to continue what we started" with his blessing, with more details to be announced subsequently.

In July 2022 the Audreys announced via their Facebook page that Tristan Goodall had died on 2 July 2022, aged 48. He had been too ill to tour for the previous two years. Coates declared, "I have to say goodbye to my dearest friend, my musical soulmate, and my grief is almost unbearable."

Members
The band members are:
 Taasha Coates – vocals, keyboards, melodica, harmonica, ukulele, guitar

Current touring members:
 Tom Kneebone – Acoustic and electric guitars, vocals
 Flik Freeman – bass
 Beej Barker – drums

Previous members:
 Tristan Goodall – Acoustic and electric guitars, banjo
 Shane O'Mara – electric guitar
 Rick Plant – bass
 Ben Wiesner- drums
 Michael Green – violin, vocals, lap steel
 Toby Lang – drums, vocals
 Lyndon Gray – double bass, vocals
 Cameron Goodall – vocals, guitars, mandocello
 David Ross MacDonald – drums
 Grant Cummerford – bass
 Brett Canning – bass, vocals
 John (Bedge) Bedggood- keys, violin, vocals

Discography

Studio albums

Compilations

EPs

Singles
{| class="wikitable plainrowheaders" style=text-align:center;
! Title
! Year
! Album
|-
! scope="row" | "Oh Honey"
| rowspan="2" | 2005
| rowspan="2" |You and Steve McQueen
|-
! scope="row" | "You and Steve McQueen"
|-
! scope="row" | "Banjo and Violin"
| rowspan="2" | 2006
| rowspan="2" |'Between Last Night and Us|-
! scope="row" | "Don't Change"
|-
! scope="row" | "Small Things"
| rowspan="2" | 2008
| rowspan="2" |'When the Flood Comes
|-
! scope="row" | "Paradise City"
|-
! scope="row" | "Trouble Somehow"
| rowspan="2" | 2010
| rowspan="3" |Sometimes the Stars
|-
! scope="row" | "Sometimes the Stars"
|-
! scope="row" | "Lonesome Valley"
| 2011
|-
! scope="row" | "Track Wreck Blues"
| 2012
| Collected
|-
! scope="row" | "My Darlin' Girl"
| rowspan="2" | 2014
| rowspan="2" |'Til My Tears Roll Away
|-
! scope="row" | "Baby Are You There?"
|-

Awards

ARIA Music Awards
The ARIA Music Awards is an annual awards ceremony that recognises excellence, innovation, and achievement across all genres of Australian music. The Audreys have been nominated for four awards and have won three.

|-
| 2006
| Between Last Night and Us
| Best Blues & Roots Album
| 
|-
| 2008
| When the Flood Comes
| Best Blues & Roots Album
| 
|-
| 2011
| Sometimes the Stars
| Best Blues & Roots Album
| 
|-
| 2014
| 'Til My Tears Roll Away
| Best Blues & Roots Album
| 
|-

Fowler's Live Music Awards
The Fowler's Live Music Awards took place from 2012 to 2014 to "recognise success and achievement over the past 12 months [and] celebrate the great diversity of original live music" in South Australia. Since 2015 they're known as the South Australian Music Awards.

 
|-
| 2012
| Audreys
| Best Acoustic Artist 
| 
|-

References

External links
 
 

Musical groups from Adelaide
Australian folk music groups
ARIA Award winners
Female-fronted musical groups
Musical groups established in 2004